E. V. Saroja (1935 - 2006) was an Indian actress and dancer. She was born on 3 November, 1935 as Engan V. Saroja. She belonged to Engan village of Thiruvarur district, Tamil Nadu.

Her debut film was En Thangai in 1952 starring M. G. Ramachandran.

Filmography

 En Thangai (Tamil, 1952)
 Gulebagavali (1955)
 Pennarasi (1955)
 Bhale Ramudu (1956) as Roopadevi, dancer
 Amara Deepam (1956)
 Paasavalai (1956)
 Madurai Veeran (1956)
 Penki Pellam (1956)
 Rambaiyin Kaadhal (1956)
 Pudhumai Pithan (1957)
 Suvarna Sundari (1957) as Parvathi
 Bhagya Rekha (1957)
 Saubhagyavati (1957)
 Karpukkarasi (1957)
 Engal Veettu Mahalakshmi (1957)
 Veera Kankanam (1957)
 Sarangadhara (1958)
 Kathavarayan (1958)
 Bhookailas (Telugu, 1958) as dancer
 Pillai Kaniyamudhu (1958)
 Appu Chesi Pappu Koodu (Telugu, 1958)... Dancer
 Athisaya Penn (Tamil, 1959)
 Uzhavukkum Thozhilukkum Vandhanai Seivom (1959)
 Padikkadha Medhai (1960)
 Adavantha Deivam (1960)
 Bhagyalakshmi as Radha (1961)
 Manapanthal (1961)
 Intiki Deepam Illale (1961)
 Velugu Needalu (Telugu, 1961)
 Iddaru Mitrulu (Telugu, 1961)
  Nallavan vaazvaan  (Tamil, 1961)
 Veera Thirumagan (Tamil, 1962)
 Chaduvukunna Ammayilu (Telugu, 1963) as Latha
  Koduthu Vaithaval (Tamil, 1963)

Death
She died of heart failure in Chennai on Friday 3 November 2006.

References

Actresses in Tamil cinema
Actresses in Telugu cinema
2006 deaths
Indian film actresses
Date of birth unknown
20th-century Indian actresses
People from Tiruvarur district
Actresses from Tamil Nadu
1935 births